Justicia nervata is a plant native to the Atlantic Forest vegetation of Brazil.

See also
 List of plants of Atlantic Forest vegetation of Brazil

nervata
Endemic flora of Brazil
Flora of the Atlantic Forest